The Grange (originally St Giles' Grange) is an affluent suburb of Edinburgh, just south of the city centre, with Morningside and Greenhill to the west, Newington to the east,  The Meadows park and Marchmont to the north, and Blackford Hill to the south. It is a conservation area characterised by large early Victorian stone-built villas and mansions, often with very large gardens. The Grange was built mainly between 1830 and 1890, and the area represented the idealisation of country living within an urban setting.

The suburb includes streets which are renowned for their pricey properties, and it is home to some of Scotland's richest people, top lawyers and businessmen. Whitehouse Terrace, in the Grange area of the Capital, was named as the priciest postcode in Zoopla's 'Rich List for 2021'.

Character of the Area
The architectural form and green environment of The Grange are attributable to the picturesque movement and characterised by romantic revivalism of the architectural forms that are original and individual in composition. The buildings are complemented by the profusion of mature trees, spacious garden settings, stone boundary walls and green open spaces. A significant level of uniformity is achieved from the use of local building materials, e.g. local grey sandstone in ashlar or coursed rubble with hand carved decoration, Scots slates, timber framed sash and case windows with plate glass.

The Grange was predominantly developed around 1830, when the growing middle class of merchants and professionals in Edinburgh were looking for secluded location where to raise their families. The Grange had the advantages of physical separation from the overcrowded medieval city and offered individual dwellings in a predominantly suburban setting in contrast to the tenements of the Georgian New Town. Houses were built with their own private gardens surrounded by high stone walls; this was in contrast with the communal living of the more central areas. Each house has its individual fashionable style of the Victorian times. The outstanding quality of many of the villas is due to the insistence of the Dick Lauder family, who commissioned the houses, on high architectural standards.

Superiors
There are mentions of 'Sanct-Geill-Grange' in charters of King David and King Edgar, as church lands attached to St. Giles parish church in Edinburgh, the king retaining the superiority. The word grange is common across Britain and normally links to an extensive farm with a central mansionhouse. On 16 June 1376, King Robert II granted the superiority of the barony and lands of St Giles to his eldest son, John, Earl of Carrick, Steward of Scotland. In 1391 the estate was conferred upon the Wardlaw family.

On 19 March 1691 a John Cant sold St Giles Grange in its entirety to William Dick. At that time, the  previously feued to the nuns was now in the possession of Sir John Napier, the famous inventor of logarithms. When Isabel Dick, the heiress, married Sir Andrew Lauder, 5th Baronet of Fountainhall, in 1731, The Grange passed to him.

Grange House

The original tower house appears to be of a very early date, possibly the 13th century, ornamented with two turrets and a battlemented roof; its position was isolated at the eastern end of the Burgh Muir, which at that time consisted of waste tracts of moorland and morass, stretching out southward as far as the Braid Hills and eastward to St. Leonard's Crags.

The mansion, The Grange House, was enlarged over the centuries, a major restoration being carried out by Sir Thomas Dick Lauder, Bt. On 16 May 1836, Lord Cockburn recorded in his diary: "There was an annular eclipse of the sun yesterday afternoon....it was a beautiful spectacle......I was on the top of the tower at The Grange House, with Sir Thomas Dick Lauder and his family."

After Sir Thomas's death in 1848, the fabric of the house gradually deteriorated, and by the 1930s the cost of maintenance and preservation had become prohibitive. Despite widespread protests, the house was demolished in 1936.  Bungalows and other houses were built on part of the site, in what is now Grange Crescent.

Stone wyverns from its gateposts, known locally as the 'Lauder griffins', were re-erected in Grange Loan. One was placed at the entrance to a stretch of Lover's Loan, a centuries-old path which was preserved in a late 19th-century redevelopment and is marked out with high stone walls separating it from the gardens on either side. At one point the path borders the Grange Cemetery, where various well-known people are buried, including Sir Thomas Dick Lauder, Hugh Miller, and Thomas Chalmers.

City expansion

In 1825 Thomas Dick Lauder, the then owner of the Grange, sold off a large area of land for development (the area between the present Dick Place and Grange Road). This linked to a new access road to the east (now called Newington Road). Lauder controlled development of the land through a strong feuing plan and developments required his approval. The original feuing plan included curious plot names such as Little Transylvania and Greater Transylvania (both north of Grange Loan). Grange House remained in a large plot in the centre of Grange Loan.

From the 1840s, The Grange was developed as an early suburb, built gradually upon the lands of The Grange estate — still owned by the Dick Lauder family. The area was originally laid out by the architect David Cousin but then the feuing was altered (1858) and greatly extended southwards (1877, following great success) by the architect Robert Reid Raeburn.

Some of the Victorian villas still retain substantial mature trees and gardens which pre-date the housing. In 1835 Earl Grey (of Reform Bill fame) stayed with Sir Thomas Dick Lauder at The Grange House, and commemorated his visit by planting an oak tree in a conspicuous spot in The Avenue, upon the bank of the north side, not very far from the ivy-clad arch. It was called 'Earl Grey's Oak' and was still healthy in 1898. It is not known if it has survived.

Within the area lies the campus of the Astley Ainslie Hospital. This large area of ground was gifted as a hospital in 1921 as part of the will of John Ainslie.

The grounds of the Carlton Cricket Club is the last vestige of the major open space which used to surround Grange House.

Grange Cemetery

This was laid out in 1847 by the Edinburgh architect David Bryce and is more rectilinear in layout than its predecessors, Warriston Cemetery and Dean Cemetery. It was original entitled the Southern Edinburgh Cemetery.

It includes a very interesting "Egyptian portal" to the land of the dead for the wife of a William Stuart (died 1868) on the north wall, by the sculptor Robert Thomson. Sculptures by William Birnie Rhind (Dr. James Cappie) and Henry Snell Gamley (David Menzies) can also be found. There are also multiple ornate Celtic crosses, mainly by Stewart McGlashan. The graves of Isabella Russell and Margaret McNicoll were designed by Robert Lorimer in 1904. Other notable graves include:

 John Brown Abercromby (1843–1929), artist
 Harry Burrows Acton (1908–1974)
 Prof David Laird Adams
 Sir Andrew Agnew, 7th Baronet
 Thomas Croxen Archer (1817–1885) botanist
 Rev William Arnot
 Rev David Arnot DD minister of St Giles Cathedral
 Sir William James and Sir James Gardiner Baird, 7th and 8th Baronets of Saughton Hall
 Very Rev John Baillie, Moderator of the General Assembly of the Church of Scotland, 1943–44
 Sir Andrew Balfour, physician (grave vandalised)
 James Bannerman (theologian) and his son William Burney Bannerman and his wife Helen Bannerman
 John Bartholomew, Sr. and John Bartholomew Jr., mapmakers
 John Begg, architect
 Alexander Montgomerie Bell, lawyer
 Henry McGrady Bell (1880–1958) traveller, diplomat and author
 Sir Robert Duncan Bell (1878–1935) senior civil servant in the Indian Raj
 George Bertram, engineer and paper-maker
 Benjamin Blyth, engineer
 Robert Henry Bow FRSE (1827–1909) photographic pioneer and civil engineer
 Hugh Wylie Brown FRSE, actuary
 Very Rev John Brown, Moderator of the General Assembly of the Church of Scotland in 1916 (his memorial also marks 4 sons lost in WWI)
 George Washington Browne, architect
 Viscount Bryce, politician
 James Bryce (geologist) and his son John Annan Bryce, MP for Inverness Burghs
 William Moir Bryce LLD (1842–1919) antiquarian
 Rev James Buchanan
 Rev Dr Thomas Burns (1853-1938) founder of the Thomas Burns Homes
 Sir John Alexander Calder
 Edward Calvert (architect)
 Hugh Cameron RSA (1835-1918) artist
 James Roderick Johnston Cameron, author, President of the Royal College of Surgeons of Edinburgh
 Rev W. J. Cameron (d.1990) twice Moderator of the General Assembly to the Free Church of Scotland
 Dr John Henry Campbell, monument by John Hutchison RSA
 John Irvine Carswell FRSE engineer
 Dr Thomas Chalmers
 Elizabeth Chantrelle (née Dyer) murdered by her husband Eugene Chantrelle
 Alexander Christie (1792-1872) of the Hudon's Bay Company
 Dugald Christie (missionary)
 Very Rev Dr Patrick Clason (1789–1867) Moderator of the General Assembly of the Free Church of Scotland 1848–49
 Rev Prof G. N. M. Collins twice Moderator of the General Assembly of the Free Church of Scotland (NW)
 Robin Cook, Labour Foreign Secretary
 Prof W. M. Court-Brown (1918–1968) radiologist and medical author
 Alexander Cowan papermaker and philanthropist, with his son James, Lord Provost of Edinburgh and MP for Edinburgh
 Sir John Cowan LLD (1844-1929) steel merchant and his son Andrew Wallace Cowan FRSA and missionary daughter Agnes Marshall Cowan holder of the first Scottish female professorship
 Sir Robert Cranston
 John Croall of Southfield (d.1871) founder of the Croall Lectures
 Rear Admiral Octavius Cumberland (1813–1877)
 Rev Prof William Cunningham
 Walter Scott Dalgleish (1834–1897), author
 Prof Andrew B. Davidson 
 William Soltau Davidson (1846–1924) pioneer of refrigerated shipping
 Lt Col Lewis Merson Davies, geologist and anti-evolutionist
 The Dick Lauder baronets
 William Kirk Dickson and his son, Rear Admiral Robert Kirk Dickson
 Alexander Graham Donald FRSE FSA FFA (d.1941) actuary
 Greta Douglas (1891–1982) artist
 Morrell Draper FRSE, Australian-born toxicologist (NW)
Rev Dr Robert James Drummond, Moderator of the General Assembly of the UF Church in 1918
 Rev Alexander Duff (missionary)
 Rev Prof John Duncan (theologian)
 Rev Patrick Fairbairn
 Charles Hamilton Fasson (1821-1892) senior surgeon during the Indian Mutiny and later Superintendent of both the old Edinburgh Infirmary and the new (1879) Edinburgh Royal Infirmary
 Prof Kenneth Fearon (1960–2016) cancer specialist
 Prof Robert McNair Ferguson LLD (1829–1912) mathematician
 Rev Thomas Finlayson
 Robert Flockhart (1778–1857) street preacher
 Rev William Galbraith (mathematician)
 Rev James Gall astronomer and founder of Carrubbers Close Mission
 William Galloway (architectural historian) (1830–897) early conservation architect and historian
 Dr Jessie Gellatly MD (1882-1935) one of Britain's first female doctors
 Archibald H. R. Goldie, FRSE, meteorologist
 Esme Gordon (1934-1993) architect
 Giles Alexander Esme Gordon
 Sir James Gowans (memorial of his own design)
 General James Hope Grant
 Alan William Greenwood FRSE, zoologist
 David Grieve FRSE PRPSE, geologist
 Edward Graham Guest (d. 1962) of McVities Guest
 John William Gulland MP and his nephew, John Masson Gulland FRS FRSE, chemist
 William Maxwell Gunn LLD (1795–1851) author
 Dr Thomas Guthrie
 Robert Halliday Gunning, surgeon and philanthropist
 Henry Haig (engraver) (1795–1848)
 Rev William Hanna (1808–1882)
 Canon Edward Joseph Hannan, co-founder of Hibernian Football Club
 Admiral John Hay (1804–1899)
 George Henderson (architect) (1846–1905)
 John Henderson (architect) (1804–1862)
 Prof William Henderson (physician and homeopath)
 Robert Herdman RSA, Victorian artist
 Rev William Maxwell Hetherington (stone carved by John Rhind)
 William Ballantyne Hodgson
 William Hole (artist)... (buried in the ground of James Lindsay WS)
 The Home baronets, John (1872–1938, 12th Baronet of Blackadder) and David George (1904–1992, 13th Baronet of Blackadder)
 John Hutchison (sculptor)
 Lady Isabel Emslie Hutton (1887–1960) physician 
 Prof Ainsley Iggo FRS (1924–2012) 
 David Irving (librarian)
 James Jamieson (dentist) FRSE
 Alexander Keith Johnston (1804–1871) geographer (also memorialising his son of the same name, an African explorer).
 Christian Isobel Johnstone (1781–1857) author, journalist and feminist
 General Sir Gordon Jolly KCIE (1886–1962)
 Prof Arthur Berriedale Keith
 David Kennedy (1825–1886) Scottish singer (subject of a monument at the foot of Calton Hill) plus his daughter Marjory Kennedy-Fraser
 Major Allan Ker VC (1883–1958) WW1 Victoria Cross recipient (memorialised on grave of Robert Darling Ker WS)
 William Joseph Kinloch-Anderson (1846–1901) founder of the kilt-making company which bears his name
 John Kinross (architect)
 Thomas Knox (1818–1879) bronze portrait by Alexander Rhind
 Thomas Dick Lauder, author and landowner
 Prof Simon Somerville Laurie, educator
 Robert Lawson FRSE, physician (1846–1896)
 Rev Prof Robert Lee DD FRSE theologian (sculpted by John Hutchison)
David Lees FRSE (1881-1934) public health expert
 William Lennie (1779–1852) grammarian
 Rev Mary Levison DD (1923-2011) (née Mary Irene Lusk), first ordained female minister in the Church of Scotland
 Prof David Liston (1799-1881) Professor of Hebrew
 Rev Prof Peter Lorimer (1812-1879) Moderator of the English Presbyterian Synod
 David Fowler Lowe FRSE LLD (1843-1924, Headmaster of George Heriot's School
 Lt David Lyell, Royal Scots (d. 1915) survivor of the Gretna Rail Disaster who was killed two months later at Gallipoli (memorial only)
 Major General William McBean VC (1818-1878) winner of the Victoria Cross at the Siege of Lucknow
 Sir George McCrae (politician) (1860–1928)
 Very Rev William J. G. McDonald (1924–2015) Moderator of the General Assembly of the Church of Scotland in 1989, presenter on radio's Thought for the Day
 Very Rev James MacGregor DD (1834–1910) Moderator of the General Assembly of the Church of Scotland 1891
 Very Rev Mackintosh MacKay (1793–1873) Moderator of the General Assembly of the Free Church of Scotland in 1849 (memorial only - buried in Duddingston Kirkyard)
 Lieutenant General Colin Mackenzie, (1806–1881), Scottish officer in the Indian Army
 Paul MacKenzie (physician) (1919–2015) soldier and sportsman
 James MacKillop, MP
 Meta Maclean, author
 John Macleod (theologian)
 Charles Maclaren, founder and editor of the Scotsman newspaper
 Very Rev Thomas McLauchlan (1815–1886) Moderator of the General Assembly of the church of Scotland in 1876
 Hector C. Macpherson FRSE author and journalist
 Sir Alexander Charles Gibson Maitland
 John Maitland (accountant) (1803 - 1865) Accountant to the Court of Session and Disruption Worthy
 Charles Alexander Malcolm, historian and author
 Rev Prof William Manson, theologian
 Hugh Marshall FRS FRSE (1868–1913) chemist
 Rev Dr Hugh Martin, theologian
 David Masson historian and his daughters Rosaline Masson and Flora Masson
 David Mekie, geographer and his son, Prof D. E. C. Mekie OBE FRSE surgeon
 Memorial to Wiliam Babington Melville, killed in the Manipur Massacre of 1891
Duncan Menzies (1837–1910) architect and engineer
 John Millar, Lord Craighill (1817–1888)
 Hugh Miller (pioneer geologist) and his son Hugh Miller FRSE
 Prof James Miller FRSE (1812–1864)
 Rev Dr William Milligan (1821–1893)
 William Beatton Moonie (1883-1961) composer
 Sir Henry Moncrieff, 2nd Baron Moncrieff, with a sculpture of his wife "Minna" on the stone
 Robert Morham, architect
 John Muir (indologist)
 Sir Andrew Mure (1826–1909) judge
 Duncan Napier, herbalist
 James Napier (chemist)
 Thomas Nelson (publisher) and his son Thomas Nelson (1822-1892)
 John Pringle Nichol, astronomer, and his wife Elizabeth Pease Nichol
 Rev Dr Maxwell Nicholson DD, author, minister of Tron Kirk and then St Stephen's
 Prof James Nicol, geologist
 Very Rev Prof Thomas Nicol DD, theological author, Moderator of the General Assembly of the Church of Scotland 1914
 Frederick Niecks, musical scholar
 John Nisbet, artist, with his 3 wives
 Pollock Sinclair Nisbet, artist
 Robert Buchan Nisbet, artist
 Rev Prof John Cochrane O'Neill (1930–2003) theological author
 Thomas Oliver, co-founder of Oliver & Boyd
Emily Rosaline Orme (1835–1915)
 George Ann Panton FRSE (1842–1903), actuary, botanist and geologist, Fellow of the Royal Society of Edinburgh
 Sir Edward Parrott politician
 Aileen Paterson (1834-2018) children's author, creator of "Maisie of Morningside" (NW)
 Robert Paterson (1825–1889) architect
 Waller Hugh Paton RSA, artist
 Very Rev David Paul DD LLD FLS, Moderator of the General Assembly of the Church of Scotland in 1915
 Very Rev Adam Philip Moderator of the General Assembly of the United Free Church of Scotland in 1921.
 Sir Robert William Philip, pioneer of tuberculosis, younger brother of Adam Philip
 Very Rev K. M. Phin (1816–1888) Moderator of the General Assembly of the Church of Scotland 1877
 James Ramage, artist (1824–1887)
 James Reed, engineer FRSE engineer
 Very Rev George T. H. Reid MC DD (1910–1990) Moderator of the General Assembly of the Church of Scotland in 1973
 Rev Prof Alexander Macdonald Renwick DD, theological author, Moderator of the General Assembly of the Free Church of Scotland in 1931
 John Thomas Rochead, architect of the Wallace Monument
Rev Dr Charles Rogers DD LLD, minister and author
 Sir Hugh Arthur Rose and his son, Sir Hugh Rose (owners of Rose's lime juice)
Lt Gen James Kerr Ross (1792–1872) wounded at the Battle of Waterloo
 Frederick Schenck, lithographer
 Dr Robert Edmund Scoresby-Jackson FRSE physician and biographer
 Sir Thomas Drummond Shiels MP
 Sir Alexander Russell Simpson and his sons, Prof James Young Simpson (scientist) and Dr George Freeland Barbour Simpson
 Dr David Skae (1814–1873) psychiatrist
 Sir William Lowrie Sleigh, Lord Provost of Edinburgh 1923–6
 Prof George Smeaton
 George Smith (1833-1919) colonial educator and writer on Indian matters
 George Smith RSA (1870-1934) artist
 Very Rev Prof Thomas Smith (1817–1906) missionary, mathematician, Moderator of the Free Church 1891–92
 Dr James Spence (1812–1882) President of the Royal College of Surgeons of Edinburgh
 Robert Cunningham Graham Spiers FRSE (1797–1847) Sheriff of Edinburgh (on the grave he is called "Graham Speirs")
 The sculptor brothers David Watson Stevenson and William Grant Stevenson buried together
 Dr Norman Lang Stevenson (1875–1967) cricketer and 1908 Olympic Bronze Medallist for Scotland at field hockey 
 Jane Taylor and her daughter Mary Jane Pritchard, both poisoned in 1865 by Edward William Pritchard
 Rev William King Tweedie DD (1803-1864) religious author and his son, Major General William Tweedie of the Sepoy mutiny
 James Thin (1824–1915), founder of a renowned Edinburgh bookshop
 Surgeon Major General Peter Stephenson Turnbull (1836–1921)
 Andrew Usher
 Sir John Usher, Baronet 
 Major General Thomas Valiant (1784–1845) (memorial only)
 Rev Dr James Veitch (1808-1879)
 Cecil Voge FRSE (1898–1978) chemist
 Sir George Warrender of Lochend, 6th Baronet (after whom the Warrender section of Marchmont is named)
 George Mackie Watson (1860–1948) architect
 Rev Robert Boog Watson (1823–1910), scientist
 David Monro Westland, architect/engineer (creator of the North Bridge)
 Prof Charles Richard Whittaker FRSE (1879–1967) anatomist
 Dr Dionysius Wielobycki (1813–1882) early homeopathic doctor
 Harry Martin Willsher, author
 Robert Wilson architect of the Edinburgh Board Schools
 Robert Wilson (1871–1928) editor of the Edinburgh Evening News and donor of the Wilson Cup
 Sir James Lawton Wingate (artist)
 Sir Alexander Kemp Wright (1859–1933), banker co-founder of the National Savings movement
 Prof David F. Wright (1937–2008), historian
 Robert Stodart Wyld LLD (1808–1893) historian
 Robert Young (biblical scholar)

There are war graves of 40 Commonwealth service personnel of both World Wars and a communal grave for the nuns of St Margaret's Convent.

Notable residents 

Residents of the suburb have included the author J.K. Rowling and the former CEO of RBS, Fred Goodwin.  Goodwin relocated from The Grange after the vandalism to which his property there was subjected but has since returned after his wife's throwing him out of their family home in Colinton due to revelations of his marital infidelity.

Oil tycoon Sir Bill Gammell, an old school friend of Tony Blair and who had George W Bush as a wedding guest, purchased property in The Grange.

Other notable residents of The Grange include writers Alexander McCall Smith, Ian Rankin, and D. M. Macalister (1832–1909) who was a renowned minister of the Free Church of Scotland and served as Moderator of the General Assembly in 1902–03. In 1900 he was living at 32 Mansionhouse Road.

Max Born, Nobel Laureate and former Tait Professor of Natural Philosophy at the University of Edinburgh lived at 84 Grange Loan. Born came to Edinburgh in 1936. He stayed until his retirement in 1952. He is recognised as one of the founders of the field of quantum mechanics. He was awarded the Nobel Prize in Physics in 1954 for fundamental research in quantum mechanics.

Marc-André Raffalovich (11 September 1864 – 14 February 1934) was a wealthy French poet, writer and defender of homosexuality, best known today for his patronage of the arts and for his lifelong relationship with the poet John Gray. Raffalovich lived at 9 Whitehouse Terrace, and his most important supporter and romantic partner John Gray also lived nearby. The two remained together until Raffalovich's sudden death in 1934. A devastated Gray died exactly four months later. Raffalovich's exposition of the view that a homosexual orientation is both natural and morally neutral was a notable contribution to the late 19th century literature on the subject.

Francis H. Underwood was an American editor and writer. He was the founder and first associate editor of The Atlantic Monthly in 1857 while still working as a publisher's assistant. He lived at 35 Mansionhouse Road.

William Henry Goold (15 December 1815 – 29 June 1897) was a Scottish minister of both the Reformed Presbyterian Church and the Free Church of Scotland who served as Moderator of the General Assembly of the Free Church 1877–78. He lived at 28 Mansionhouse Road.

David Patrick (writer) FRSE LLD (1849[1] – 22 March 1914) was a Scottish writer and editor. He edited Chambers's Encyclopaedia from 1888 to 1892,[1] Chambers's Biographical Dictionary in 1897 and Chambers's Cyclopaedia of English Literature with F. H. Groome from 1901 to 1903. He lived at 20 Mansionhouse Road.

George Smeaton (1814–1889) was a 19th-century Scottish theologian and Greek scholar. He lived at 13 South Mansionhouse Road.

John Duns (minister) FRSE (1820–1909) was Professor of Natural Science at New College, Edinburgh. He was a prolific author on both scientific and religious topics. He lived at 4 North Mansionhouse Road.

Thomas Smith (missionary) (8 July 1817 – 26 May 1906) was a Scottish missionary and mathematician who was instrumental in establishing India's zenana missions in 1854. He served as Moderator of the General Assembly of the Free Church of Scotland 1891–92. He lived at 10 Mansionhouse Road.

Frederick Hallard FRSE PRSSA (11 May 1821 – 12 January 1882) was a Scottish advocate and legal author. He served as senior Sheriff-Substitute for Midlothian 1855 to 1882 and was Director of the Edinburgh Philosophical Institution and President of the Royal Scottish Society of Arts. He lived at 7 Whitehouse Terrace.

Dame Elizabeth Blackadder (1931 – 2021), artist and printmaker, lived in Fountainhall Road with her husband John Houston from the 1950s until her death in 2021.

In popular culture 

The Grange was also a principal filming location during the production of the BBC Three comedy drama Pramface which starred Scarlett Alice Johnson and Sean Michael Verey in the lead roles. The Grange features extensively in the showpiece but is appropriated in order to pose as an upmarket North London suburb due to its appearance similarities for the sake of plot integration.

Notes

References
 Stewart-Smith, J; The Grange of St Giles, Edinburgh, 1898, is possibly the best history of The Grange extant.

External links
Bartholomew's Chronological map of Edinburgh (1919)
Grange Association
Edinburgh University Gazetteer article on The Grange

Areas of Edinburgh